The 1969–70 Weber State Wildcats men's basketball team represented Weber State College during the 1969–70 NCAA University Division basketball season. Members of the Big Sky Conference, the Wildcats were led by second-year head coach Phil Johnson and played their home games on campus at Wildcat Gym in Ogden, Utah.

The conference tournament was six years away, and for the third consecutive season, Weber State won the Big Sky title and played in the 25-team NCAA tournament.  In the West regional at nearby Provo, they met Jerry Tarkanian's Long Beach State 49ers in the first round and lost by 19 points.

Junior forward Willie Sojourner was a unanimous selection to the all-conference team, joined by senior guard Sessions Harlan.  Sojourner was an honorable mention AP All-American twice and was All-Big Sky for three consecutive seasons.

After the following season, Johnson became an assistant in the NBA with the Chicago Bulls under Dick Motta, whom he had played for in high school in Idaho and coached under at Weber.

Postseason result

|-
!colspan=9 style=| NCAA tournament

References

External links
Sports Reference – Weber State Wildcats: 1969–70 basketball season
2015–16 Media Guide: 1969–70 season

Weber State Wildcats men's basketball seasons
Weber State